Leon Roberts (born 30 April 1956) is a South African former cricketer. He played in twelve first-class matches for Boland from 1980/81 to 1985/86.

See also
 List of Boland representative cricketers

References

External links
 

1956 births
Living people
South African cricketers
Boland cricketers
People from Stellenbosch
Cricketers from the Western Cape